Four and a half LIM domains protein 5 is a protein that in humans is encoded by the FHL5 gene.

Function 

The protein encoded by this gene is coordinately expressed with activator of cAMP-responsive element modulator (CREM). It is associated with CREM and confers a powerful transcriptional activation function. CREM acts as a transcription factor essential for the differentiation of spermatids into mature spermatozoa. There are multiple polyadenylation sites found in this gene.

Interactions 

FHL5 has been shown to interact with CREB1 and CAMP responsive element modulator.

References

Further reading

External links